Cavaliers of the Crown (Swedish: Kronans kavaljerer) is a 1930 Swedish silent comedy film directed by Gustaf Edgren and starring Fridolf Rhudin, Brita Appelgren and  Weyler Hildebrand. It was shot at the Råsunda Studios in Stockholm. The film's sets were designed by the art director Vilhelm Bryde.

Cast
 Fridolf Rhudin as	Fridolf Svensson
 Weyler Hildebrand as 	Göran Göransson
 Brita Appelgren as 	Mary Björklund
 Stina Berg as 	Aunt Julia
 Helge Kihlberg as 	Uncle Göran
 Ragnar Arvedson as Dick Carter / Charles Paterson
 Nils Ericsson as 	Spiggen
 Knut Broberg as Cabaret Artist
 Valdemar Dalquist as 	Emmcee
 Ernst Brunman as 	Lawyer 
 Carl-Hugo Calander as 	Man 
 Eddie Figge as 	Mrs. Carter 
 Wictor Hagman as 	Officer 
 Olle Hilding as 	Con Man 
 Gustav Hjorth as 	Man 
 Maja Jerlström as 	Woman 
 Ludde Juberg as 	Andersson 
 Georg af Klercker as Officer 
 Axel Lagerberg as 	Man 
 Robert Ryberg as 	Con Man 
 Carl Ström as Police chief

References

Bibliography
 Qvist, Per Olov & von Bagh, Peter. Guide to the Cinema of Sweden and Finland. Greenwood Publishing Group, 2000.

External links

1930 films
1930 comedy films
Swedish comedy films
Swedish silent feature films
Swedish black-and-white films
Films directed by Gustaf Edgren
1930s Swedish-language films
Silent comedy films
1930s Swedish films